Firing Line: Cardiff Castle Museum of the Welsh Soldier is a museum which exhibits the collections of the 1st The Queen's Dragoon Guards and the Royal Welsh. It occupies the lower floor of the interpretation centre at Cardiff Castle.

History
The individual collections of the Queen's Dragoon Guards Museum, which had been based at Bowness-on-Windermere, and of the Welch Regiment Museum, which had been based in the Black and Barbican Towers of Cardiff Castle, were brought together at Cardiff Castle in 2010.

Collections
The museum is dedicated to the history of the 1st The Queen's Dragoon Guards and the Royal Welsh. The museum holds the Victoria Crosses awarded to Ambrose Madden and Sir Hugh Rowlands of the 41st (Welch) Regiment of Foot during the Crimean War.

References

External links 
Museum of the Welsh Soldier
Royal Welsh Museum
Queen's Dragoon Guards Museum
 

Museums in Cardiff
Military and war museums in Wales
Regimental museums in Wales
Royal Welsh
Museums established in 2010
2010 establishments in Wales